Chicago Calling is a 1951 drama film directed by John Reinhardt and starring Dan Duryea and Mary Anderson.

The film centers on the unsuccessful drinking photographer Bill Cannon (Dan Duryea), whose wife abandons him, leaving with their daughter to another city. When the two get into a car accident along the way, Bill desperately seeks for money to call to Chicago to find out about their fate. Having met an unfortunate single boy in the process, Bill gets so close with him that, after learning about his daughter's death, he starts calling the boy his son.

Noting the weaknesses in the plot, critics nevertheless noted that the film is still good thanks to the strong play of Duryea.

Plot
Bill Cannon's drinking and seeming unwillingness to settle down in a job costs him his family. His wife, Mary, decides to move to her mother's in Baltimore, and is taking her and Bill's daughter, Nancy, with her.  An aspiring but failed photographer, Bill pawns his camera to pay for Mary's car-ride share; he then goes on an alcohol binge.

Finally returning home two days later, Bill meets a telephone lineman, Jim, who is removing the phone because of an overdue bill. A telegram from Mary is also there. Nancy has been seriously injured in a car crash near Chicago, and Mary has wired that she will telephone Bill to let him know how Nancy's required surgery goes.

In desperation, Bill persuades Jim to keep the phone line there for 24 more hours. He desperately seeks ways to get the $53 he needs but is refused loans and relief. A young boy, Bobby Kimball, accidentally hits, but only slightly injures, Bill's dog with his bicycle.

The two become friends and Bill learns that Bobby is being raised by an abusive sister, Babs, who intends to place him in an orphanage when she marries her boyfriend.  Bobby offers the money he has saved working at the market, $57.75, to Bill to pay for the phone service. They go to Bobby's home where the boy discovers his savings bank is missing.  Babs' boyfriend is napping on Bobby's bed and a roll of money has slipped from his pocket.  After Babs tells Bobby she hid the savings bank for safety, Bill leaves.  Bobby catches up to him and gives him the boyfriend's money, over $100. They agree that Bill will use what he needs and when Bobby finds his own money, he will replace it all in a manner that will ensure the boyfriend never knows his money was taken.

The phone company is closed by the time Bill arrives, so the two take in a baseball game.  After the game ends, Bobby notices the money is gone from his jeans' pocket.  However, they discover that someone turned it in to the lost and found.  A conscience-stricken Bill decides to return it. Babs and her boyfriend come home as Bill is trying to call Chicago from their apartment.  Bobby and Bill point out they have returned the money, but the boyfriend throws Bill out and calls the police.

Bill manages to land an overnight job on a construction site and next morning uses the money he earned to call Chicago from a pay phone.  Bobby had been waiting outside Bill's apartment but, after talking with Jim, goes looking for Bill.  He finds him and lets him know that the police will likely be showing up.  No information is forthcoming from Chicago, so the two return to Bill's. Bobby remembers to mention that Jim had been by to take out the phone.  However, the lineman calls from the telephone pole to let Bill know he has decided to allow him to receive the expected call from Mary, for free, thanks to Bobby's persuasion earlier.  As the police arrive to arrest Bill, the call comes through. He learns that his daughter has died.  Overhearing this, the officers work it out so that Bill can remain free.

Bill wanders carelessly through the city, ending up at a railroad yard where he contemplates suicide.  Bobby has followed him and calls out as a train bears down on Bill. After the train passes, the yard engineer asks Bill if he was trying to kill himself and if Bobby is his son. Bill assures both that he is not going to kill himself and that the boy is his son. The two walk away together.

Cast
 Dan Duryea as  William R. Cannon
 Mary Anderson as Mary Cannon
 Gordon Gebert as Bobby
 Ross Elliott as Jim
 Melinda Plowman as Nancy Cannon
 Judy Brubaker as Barbara 'Babs' Kimball
 Marsha Jones as Peggy
 Roy Engel as Pete

References

External links 
 
 
 
 

1951 films
1951 crime drama films
American black-and-white films
American crime drama films
Film noir
Films directed by John Reinhardt
Films scored by Heinz Roemheld
Films set in Los Angeles
Films shot in Los Angeles
United Artists films
1950s English-language films
1950s American films